The Garawarra State Conservation Area is a protected conservation area that is located on the southern suburban fringe of Greater Sydney, in the state of New South Wales, in eastern Australia. Garawarra was gazetted as a park in 1987, and added, together with the Royal National Park, to the Australian National Heritage List on 15 September 2006.

Garawarra features heathland, eucalyptus forest, rainforest and wildflowers in late winter and early spring. Commonly seen wildlife include the Lyrebird and Echidna. The soils are based on Hawkesbury Sandstone and the Narrabeen group of sedimentary rocks. The climate is humid and temperate, with warm summers and mild winters.

Features

Flora 
Dry heathland on the ridges is dominated by typical Sydney sandstone plants, such as Banksia, Boronia, Leptospermum, Epacris, Acacia, Flannel Flowers, Christmas Bells, and many plants in the pea family. The drier eucalyptus woodland features trees species such as Sydney Red Gum, dwarf apple, Red Bloodwood, Yellow Bloodwood, and Sydney Peppermint.

Significant species include Blackbutt, Sydney Blue Gum, Turpentine and Grey Ironbark.

At first appearance, the warm temperate rainforests seem typical of the northern Illawarra. Warm temperate species such as Sassafras and Jackwood are common. However, the rainforests are quite diverse with many interesting sub-tropical species. Such as Small-leaved Fig, Bollygum, White Hazelwood, Brush Bloodwood, Citronella, Native Tamarind and Myrtle Ebony.

Fauna 
The area has a rich assembly of rainforest birds, as well as a variety of frogs and reptiles.

See also

 Heathcote National Park
 Protected areas of New South Wales

References

External links

State conservation areas in New South Wales
Forests of New South Wales
Parks in Sydney
Protected areas established in 1987
1987 establishments in Australia